Carenno (locally ) is a comune (municipality) in the Province of Lecco in the Italian region Lombardy, located about  northeast of Milan and about  southeast of Lecco.

Carenno borders the following municipalities: Calolziocorte, Costa Valle Imagna, Erve, Torre de' Busi, Valsecca.

Demographic evolution

References

External links
 www.comune.carenno.lc.it/

Cities and towns in Lombardy